Oman Club (also known locally as Al-Ahmar, "The Red(s)" or simply as Oman) is an Omani football club based in Muscat. The club is currently playing in the First Division League of Oman Football Association. Their home ground is Sultan Qaboos Sports Complex, but they also recognize the older Royal Oman Police Stadium as their home ground. Both stadiums are government owned, but Oman Club also own their own personal stadium and sports equipments, as well as their own training facilities.

Being a multisport club
Although being mainly known for their football, Oman Club like many other clubs in Oman, have not only football in their list, but also hockey, volleyball, handball, basketball, badminton, squash and chess. They also have a youth football team competing in the Omani Youth league.

Colors, kit providers and sponsors
Like the Oman national football team, Oman Club have also long-chosen red (with white shorts) or white (with red shorts) (Away) as the colors to represent them, varying themselves from neighbors Bowsher Club (Blue) and Muscat Club (Red) kits. They have also had many different sponsors over the years.

Honours and achievements

National titles
Omani League
 Champions (1): 1996–97
 Runners-up (1): 1995–96
Sultan Qaboos Cup
 Winners (2): 1979, 1994

International titles
Asian Club Championship
 Runners-up (1): 1993–94
Rovers Cup
 Winners (1): 1995

Club performance-International Competitions

AFC competitions
Asian Club Championship : 2 appearances
1993–94 : Runners-up
1998–99 : First Round
Asian Cup Winners' Cup : 1 appearance
1995 : First Round

References

External links
Oman Club Profile at Soccerway.com
Oman Club Profile at Goalzz.com

1942 establishments in Oman
Association football clubs established in 1942
Football clubs in Oman
Sports clubs in Muscat, Oman
Omani League